Free Frank McWorter (1777 – September 7, 1854) was an American born into slavery who bought his own freedom in Kentucky and in 1836 founded the town of New Philadelphia in Illinois; he was the first African American to plat and register a town, and establish a planned community in the United States.  The New Philadelphia Town Site was listed on the National Register of Historic Places in 2005 and designated a National Historic Landmark in 2009.

Frank McWorter was born on a Kentucky plantation to an enslaved African-American mother. His white owner was also his biological father.  In his spare time, after completing work for his owner (and father), Frank was allowed to use a cave to gather and prepare the natural ingredients for gunpowder for  sale.  In this way, Frank was able to save sufficient funds to first buy his wife's freedom, and Frank then bought his own (thus, he became "Free" Frank).  Over the years, McWorter and his estate spent about $500,000 (in 2021 dollars) to buy the freedom of some 15 enslaved family members.  Several of these freedom purchases were financed by sale of his New Philadelphia, Illinois lots.

In the late 20th century, a local history group recruited archaeologists to explore the long-abandoned town site.  Teams from the University of Maryland, College Park, University of Illinois, Urbana-Champaign, and De Paul University have worked for years on research and excavations, collected data about residents from census and land records, and turned up thousands of artifacts.  In addition they have trained students at summer field schools, and published reports, articles, and books on the history of McWorter, his family and his town.

McWorter descendants donated the collected 11 volumes of documentation to the Abraham Lincoln Presidential Library in February 2008.  In addition, the family donated a bronze bust of Frank McWorter by his great-great-granddaughter Shirley McWorter Moss.

Biography
Frank McWorter was born in 1777 into slavery in South Carolina to Juda, born in West Africa, abducted into slavery and transported to the colony.  His father was likely her white enslaver, George McWhorter, a Scots-Irish planter.  According to family tradition, Juda had to convince McWhorter to allow his mixed-race son to live.

In 1795 McWhorter moved to Pulaski County, Kentucky, and took Frank to build and later manage his holdings there.  Frank tended the farm, but McWhorter also leased him to work for neighbors as a laborer. From being hired out, Frank learned business skills and earned more money than his master required him to hand over. After McWhorter moved to Tennessee, he continued to have Frank manage his farm in Kentucky.  Frank used his savings to create a saltpeter production operation, for which there was considerable demand during the War of 1812.

Marriage and family
In 1799, Frank married Lucy, an enslaved African American on a neighboring plantation. They had 13 children born into slavery, of whom four – Juda, Frank, Sally, and Solomon – survived. By 1817 Frank had earned enough money to buy Lucy from her master for $800. She was pregnant at the time with their son Squire, and he was (later) freeborn. Two years after that, in 1819, Frank bought his own freedom at the same price. He then called himself "Free Frank", which served notice that he was legally free, and that it was known to townspeople that he was free. It was not uncommon for free black citizens to be kidnapped and enslaved. In 1829, Free Frank traded his saltpeter plant in exchange for the freedom of his son Frank, who had fled to Canada and was a fugitive. This allowed his son to return to the United States as a free man. By this time he and Lucy also had three surviving freeborn children: Squire, Commodore and Lucy Ann.

Move to Illinois
In 1830 Frank, Lucy and their four free children moved to Pike County, Illinois. By the second year they started farming. The town site, which was divided into 144 lots, was registered with government authorities in 1836. McWorter established residence in New Philadelphia with his family and sold other lots to new residents. Both blacks and whites settled there and supported an integrated school. It was the crossroads of an agricultural community and, when founded, proposed as being on the route of a planned Illinois-Michigan canal (which was never built.)

In 1837, Free Frank petitioned the Illinois legislature (as was required) so that he could officially take the surname McWorter. In that same year, the legislation was passed to "make 'Frank McWorter' his legal name."  This technicality enabled him to have certain rights normally reserved for white men in Illinois. He could bring lawsuits to court, and could legally marry his wife of over 40 years. But, he still could not vote."

McWorter was the first black man in the United States to incorporate a municipality.  He served as mayor of New Philadelphia, which was soon settled by African Americans and European Americans, for years.

McWorter lived most of the rest of his life in western Illinois, with intervals in Kentucky before the American Civil War to buy freedom for his three grown children and grandchildren left in Kentucky.  For instance, in 1835 he returned and purchased the freedom of his son Solomon.  On each trip he risked capture by unscrupulous slave traders, despite his legally free status.

McWorter died on September 7, 1854; by that time he had bought the freedom of eight more of his relatives.  Through his work, he gained freedom for 16 members of his family. His heirs used his inheritance to free seven more relatives.

Town's decline
In 1869 the first railroad was built through Pike County, bypassing New Philadelphia to the north for Baylis, which had a train station. Businesses moved there for better access.  The population of New Philadelphia rapidly declined. By the end of the nineteenth century, some of the townsite had been reverted to farmland for cultivation, but other areas were inhabited through the 1920s.

Legacy

 McWorter's gravesite was listed on the National Register of Historic Places in 1988.  It is located about 4 miles east of Barry, Illinois off U.S. Route 36.
 A portion of I-72 in Pike County was designated the Frank McWorter Memorial Highway.
 The New Philadelphia Town Site was listed on the National Register of Historic Places in 2005 and designated a National Historic Landmark in 2009.

Further reading
  

  Walker, Juliet E. K., Free Frank: A Black Pioneer on the Antebellum Frontier, Lexington, KY: University Press of Kentucky, 1983.

References

External links
 Free Frank McWorter Website
 New Philadelphia Association
 "Historical Landscapes of New Philadelphia, Illinois", University of Illinois
 McWorter Family Website
 "Prairie Fire: Free Frank and New Philadelphia (WILL-TV)". YouTube video
 

18th-century American slaves
19th-century American slaves
American city founders
Black slave owners in the United States
People from Pike County, Illinois
People from Pulaski County, Kentucky
People from South Carolina
1777 births
1854 deaths